An oval is a closed curve in a plane which resembles the outline of an egg. The term is not very specific, but in some areas (projective geometry, technical drawing, etc.) it is given a more precise definition, which may include either one or two axes of symmetry of an ellipse. In common English, the term is used in a broader sense: any shape which reminds one of an egg. The three-dimensional version of an oval is called an ovoid.

Oval in geometry

The term oval when used to describe curves in geometry is not well-defined, except in the context of projective geometry. Many distinct curves are commonly called ovals or are said to have an "oval shape". Generally, to be called an oval, a plane curve should resemble the outline of an egg or an ellipse. In particular, these are common traits of ovals:

 they are differentiable (smooth-looking), simple (not self-intersecting), convex, closed, plane curves;
 their shape does not depart much from that of an ellipse, and
 an oval would generally have an axis of symmetry, but this is not required.
Here are examples of ovals described elsewhere:
 Cassini ovals
 portions of some elliptic curves
 Moss's egg
 superellipse
 Cartesian oval
 stadium

An ovoid is the surface in 3-dimensional space generated by rotating an oval curve about one of its axes of symmetry.
The adjectives ovoidal and ovate mean having the characteristic of being an ovoid, and are often used as synonyms for "egg-shaped".

Projective geometry

In a projective plane a set  of points is called an oval, if:
 Any line  meets  in at most two points, and
 For any point  there exists exactly one tangent line  through , i.e., }.

For finite planes (i.e. the set of points is finite) there is a more convenient characterization:
 For a finite projective plane of order  (i.e. any line contains  points) a set  of points is an oval if and only if  and no three points are collinear (on a common line).

An ovoid in a projective space is a set   of points such that:
 Any line intersects   in at most 2 points, 
 The tangents at a point cover a hyperplane (and nothing more), and 
  contains no lines.

In the finite case only for dimension 3 there exist ovoids. A convenient characterization is:
In a 3-dim. finite projective space of order  any pointset   is an ovoid if and only if || and no three points are collinear.

Egg shape
The shape of an egg is approximated by the "long" half of a prolate spheroid, joined to a "short" half of a roughly spherical ellipsoid, or even a slightly oblate spheroid. These are joined at the equator and share a principal axis of rotational symmetry, as illustrated above.  Although the term egg-shaped usually implies a lack of reflection symmetry across the equatorial plane, it may also refer to true prolate ellipsoids.  It can also be used to describe the 2-dimensional figure that, if revolved around its major axis, produces the 3-dimensional surface.

Technical drawing

In technical drawing, an oval is a figure constructed from two pairs of arcs, with two different radii (see image on the right). The arcs are joined at a point in which lines tangential to both joining arcs lie on the same line, thus making the joint smooth. Any point of an oval belongs to an arc with a constant radius (shorter or longer), but in an ellipse, the radius is continuously changing.

In common speech
In common speech, "oval" means a shape rather like an egg or an ellipse, which may be two-dimensional or three-dimensional. It also often refers to a figure that resembles two semicircles joined by a rectangle, like a cricket infield, speed skating rink or an athletics track. However, this is most correctly called a stadium.

The term "ellipse" is often used interchangeably with oval, despite not being a precise synonym. The term "oblong" is often used incorrectly to describe an elongated oval or 'stadium' shape. However, in geometry, an oblong is a rectangle with unequal adjacent sides (i.e., not a square).

See also

 Ellipse
 Ellipsoidal dome
 Stadium (geometry)
 Vesica piscis – a pointed oval
 Symbolism of domes

Notes 

 

Plane curves
Elementary shapes